Kazachok is a rural locality (a selo) and the administrative center of Kazachenskoye Rural Settlement, Starooskolsky District, Belgorod Oblast, Russia. The population was 486 as of 2010. There are 9 streets.

Geography 
Kazachok is located 34 km south of Stary Oskol (the district's administrative centre) by road. Golofeyevka is the nearest rural locality.

References 

Rural localities in Starooskolsky District